Helen Cox may refer to:

Helen Cox High School, Harvey, Louisiana, USA
Helen Cox (politician) (1974–2016), British politician better known as Jo Cox